"Think" is a rhythm and blues song written by Lowman Pauling and originally recorded by his group The "5" Royales. Released as a single on King Records in 1957, it was a national hit and reached number nine on the U.S. R&B chart.

James Brown & The Famous Flames version
In 1960, James Brown and The Famous Flames recorded a cover version of "Think". The song's instrumental backing featured a pronounced rhythmic attack that anticipated Brown's later funk music. Critic Peter Guralnick described Brown's version of the song as a "radical reworking... Sung rapid-fire with the kind of sharp prompting from the Famous Flames that was the aural equivalent of their precision steps, 'Think' embodied an approach different from any in the past, with not only the song but the structure of the song turned inside out and a classic shuffle blues rhythmically and melodically transformed." Douglas Wolk called it "[Brown's] first great dance record."

"Think" was released as a single on the King Records subsidiary label Federal Records and charted #7 R&B and #33 Pop. ("Think"'s B-side, "You've Got the Power", was also a hit, reaching #14 R&B and #86 Pop.) It was Brown and The Famous Flames' first recording to enter the Pop Top 40, and their next-to-last single for the Federal label before they switched to King. "Think" was also included on Brown's 1960 album of the same name.

Personnel
 James Brown – lead vocal

and The Famous Flames:
 Bobby Byrd – vocals
 Bobby Bennett – vocals
 Baby Lloyd Stallworth – vocals
 Bill Hollings – vocals
 Johnny Terry – vocals

with the James Brown Band
 Alfred Corley – alto saxophone
 J.C. Davis – tenor saxophone
 Bobby Roach – guitar
 Bernard Odum – bass guitar
 Nat Kendrick – drums

Other James Brown versions
James Brown & The Famous Flames recorded an extremely fast live rendition of "Think" for their 1963 album Live at the Apollo. Brown also performs the song on Live at the Apollo, Volume II in a duet with Marva Whitney.

In 1967, Brown recorded "Think" in the studio as a duet with Vicki Anderson. The version grazed the bottom of the Pop chart, peaking at #100. Brown returned to "Think" again in 1973, when he released two different solo performances of the song as singles on the Polydor label, both of them backed with his cover of The Beatles' "Something". Both versions charted, the former at #15 R&B and #77 Pop, the latter at #37 R&B and #80 Pop.

Other cover versions
 Bobby John of the Kings of Rhythm covered the song which was released on Ike & Tina Turner's 1964 album Revue Live.
Mick Jagger covered "Think" on his 1993 solo album Wandering Spirit.
 People! covered the song on their 1969 album Both Sides of People and again on Best of People! Vol. 2 (2006).
 Booker T. & the M.G.'s recorded an instrumental version of the song for their 1966 album And Now!.
 Linn County covered the James Brown version of the song on the 1968 album, Proud Flesh Soothseer.

References

1957 songs
1957 singles
1960 singles
1967 singles
1973 singles
The "5" Royales songs
The Famous Flames songs
James Brown songs
Songs written by Lowman Pauling
Male–female vocal duets
King Records (United States) singles